Phosphatidylinositol-glycan biosynthesis class F protein is a protein that in humans is encoded by the PIGF gene.

Function 
This gene encodes a protein that is involved in glycosylphosphatidylinositol (GPI)-anchor biosynthesis. The GPI-anchor is a glycolipid which contains three mannose molecules in its core backbone. The GPI-anchor is found on many blood cells and serves to anchor proteins to the cell surface. This protein and another GPI synthesis protein, PIGO, function in the transfer of ethanolaminephosphate (EtNP) to the third mannose in GPI. At least two alternatively spliced transcripts encoding distinct isoforms have been found for this gene.

See also 
 VEGF

Model organisms 
Model organisms have been used in the study of PIGF function. A conditional knockout mouse line called Pigftm1a(KOMP)Wtsi was generated at the Wellcome Trust Sanger Institute. Male and female animals underwent a standardized phenotypic screen to determine the effects of deletion. Additional screens performed:  - In-depth immunological phenotyping

References

Further reading